The Men's 50 kilometre classical event of the FIS Nordic World Ski Championships 2015 was held on 1 March 2015.

Results
The race was started at 13:30.

References

Men's 50 kilometre classical